Angano ... Angano ... nouvelles de Madagascar is a 1989 documentary film.

Synopsis 
A journey through the tales and legends of Madagascar, between reality and imagination, tinged with humor and tenderness that opts for the oral tradition to portray Malagasy culture. This documentary was chosen among the twenty most outstanding films in the Cinéma du Réel Festival.

Awards 
 Festival dei Popoli 1989
 Cinéma du Réel 1989
 Vues d'Afrique 1989

References 

1989 films
French documentary films
Malagasy documentary films
1989 documentary films
1980s French films